Religion in Taiwan is characterised by a diversity of religious beliefs and practices, predominantly those pertaining to the continued preservation of the ancient Chinese culture and religion. Freedom of religion is inscribed in the constitution of the Republic of China (Taiwan), and ranks high at 9.2 on the Freedom Scale in 2018 according to the World Bank. The majority of Taiwanese people practice a combination of Buddhism and Taoism often with a Confucian worldview, which is collectively termed as Chinese folk religion.

Many statistical analyses try to distinguish between Buddhism and Taoism in Taiwan, which, along with Confucianism, are rather aspects within broader "ancient Chinese religion". It is hard to make such distinction because various Taoist deities are worshipped alongside deities which originated in Buddhism, for instance Guanyin, in many temples across the country.

, there were 15,175 religious buildings in Taiwan, approximately one place of worship per 1,572 residents. 12,279 temples were dedicated to Taoism and Buddhism. There were 9,684 Taoist Temples, 2,317 Buddhist Temples, and 2,845 Christian Churches. In Taiwan's 36,000 square kilometers of land, there are more than 33,000 places for religious (believers) to worship and gather. Averaging almost one religious building (temple, church, etc.) for every square kilometer, Taiwan is considered to have the highest density of religious buildings, making it the "most religious" region in the area where Chinese is the majority language.

History
Prior to the 17th century, the island of Taiwan was inhabited by the Taiwanese aborigines of Austronesian stock, and there were small settlements of Chinese and Japanese maritime traders and pirates. Taiwanese aborigines traditionally practised an animistic ethnic religion. When the island fell under Dutch rule in 1624, Protestantism was spread to the Taiwanese aborigines. Two years later, with the transition to Spanish rule, the Catholic Church was introduced into the island.

When the Han Chinese began to settle the island and form the Taiwanese Chinese ethnic group, exchanges between the indigenous religion of the Austronesian aborigines and the Chinese folk religion occurred. For instance, Ali-zu, the Siraya god of fertility, has been incorporated into the Han pantheon in some places of Taiwan.

17th and 18th centuries

A large influx of Han Chinese began in the 1660s with the transition of imperial power from the Ming dynasty to the Manchurian Qing dynasty. Many Ming loyalists fled to the south, including Zheng Chenggong alias Koxinga, a military warlord who fought against the Manchu dynasty. He sailed to Taiwan in 1661 with thousands of troops, and in a war with the Dutch, he defeated and drove out the Dutch military forces and established the Kingdom of Tungning, the first Chinese state on the island. Chinese settlers, mostly from Fujian and Guangdong, began to migrate to the island. The policy of migration to Taiwan was restrictive until 1788, even after the island came under the political control of the Qing in 1683.

Chinese migrants brought with them the Chinese traditional religions from their hometown, which served to integrate communities around the worship of Chinese Deities. As the settlers were mostly males, came from different areas, and at first not many people shared the same surnames and belonged to the same kins, ancestral shrines of kinship gods did not develop until the 1790s, when sufficient generations of families had established on the island.

The first settlers in Koxinga and Qing periods brought with them images or incense ashes from mainland temples, installed them in homes or temporary thatched huts, and later in proper temples, as economic circumstances permitted to build them. Prominent temples became the foci of religious, political and social life, often eclipsing Qing officials and state-sponsored temples in their influence.

There is little evidence that the doctrinal and initiatory religions of Buddhism and Taoism were active during this period. Taiwan, as a frontier land, was not attractive for Buddhist and Taoist religious leaders.

19th century
During the mid-Qing dynasty, sects of popular Buddhism which the Japanese authorities would have later lumped together with the religions of fasting (zhāijiāo) because of their vegetarian precepts, began to send missionaries from the mainland to Taiwan. They were more successful in attracting converts than either pure Buddhism or Taoism. Japanese researches of the early colonial period identified zhaijiao sects as a line of the Linji school of Chan Buddhism, although contemporary scholars know that they were centered on a female creator deity, Wusheng Laomu, and identify them as branches of Luoism disguising as a form of Buddhism free of ordained clergy. Zhaijiao sects identify the sangha as the community of believers, not as a separate clergy.

Apart from zhaijiao Buddhist sects, other folk religious sects, that were mistakenly classified as Buddhist by the Japanese government, were active in Taiwan. The most prominent were the three religions of fasting: the Jinchuang, the Longhua, and Xiantiandao traditions (the latter was introduced to Taiwan in the mid-19th century).

20th century—Japanese rule

In 1895, the Manchu government ceded Taiwan to Japan as part of the terms of surrender following the First Sino-Japanese War. During the fifty-one years of Japanese rule, governors enacted regulations to control the activities of "native religions". During a first period from 1895 to 1915, the Japanese adopted a laissez-faire policy towards native religions. During a second phase from 1915 to 1937, the government tried to vigorously regulate local religions.

During the Japanese period many indigenous groups were forcibly converted to Shintoism, only a few (such as the Saisiyat people) were able to resist and maintain their traditions. Often this was done by convincing Japanese anthropologists to come to Taiwan and document religious traditions as legitimate cultural heritage however even the indigenous people allowed to keep some traditional ceremonies were still forced to pray at Shinto temples.

Buddhism, as a shared heritage of China and Japan, received better treatment than Chinese folk religion and Taoism. Some Taiwanese Buddhist groups cooperated with the Japanese government, and Japanese Buddhist sects sent missionaries to Taiwan and even worked with zhaijiao Buddhist groups. The total number of Japanese Buddhist groups that were introduced to Taiwan could be categorized into 14 sects under 8 schools. However, given the profound differences between Chinese and Japanese Buddhist traditions (among others, Japanese priests marry, eat meat and drink wine, all of which Chinese monks abstain from), the "Japanisation" of Chinese Buddhism was resisted by Taiwanese Buddhist communities.

In 1915, Japanese religious policies in Taiwan changed after the "Xilai Hermitage incident". The hermitage was a zhaijiao Buddhist hall where the follower Yu Qingfang (余清芳) started an anti-Japanese uprising, in which many other folk religious and Taoist sects took part. The Japanese government discovered the plot and Yu Qingfang was executed in a speedy trial together with ninety-four other followers.

After the incident, the Japanese government became suspicious of what it called Taiwan's . The government began to investigate, register and regulate local temples, and it created islandwide Buddhist religious associations—into which even zhaijiao Buddhist groups were enrolled—whose charters recommended loyalty to the government.

In 1937, after the Marco Polo Bridge Incident and the start of the Second Sino-Japanese War, Tokyo ordered the rapid acculturation of the peoples of Japan's colonies. This included an effort to disaccustom people from Chinese traditional religions and convert them into the nexus of State Shinto. Many Shinto shrines were established in Taiwan. Chinese family altars were replaced with kamidana and butsudan, and a Japanese calendar of religious festivals was introduced.

The subsequent "temples' restructuration movement" caused much consternation among the Chinese population and had far-reaching effects. Its inception can be traced back to the "Conference for Improving Popular Customs" held in 1936, that far from promoting a razing of temples discussed measures for a reform and standardisation of Taoist and folk temple practices.

The outbreak of open war between China and Japan in 1937 led to a proscription of practices and even stronger measures, as Japanese officials saw the religious culture centered around folk temples as the major obstacle to Japanisation. Consequently, some local officials began to close and to demolish temples, burning their images, confiscating their cash and real estates, a measure that they called "sending the gods to Heaven". In 1940, when a new governor-general took office, the "temples' restructuration movement" was halted.

The Japanese persecution of Chinese folk religion led to an increase in skepticism and loss of faith among the Chinese. As a result of this loss of faith in gods, Japanese police reported a general decline in public morals. The policies also resulted in the disappearance of the small Muslim community, until Islam was reintroduced by the Kuomintang with their retreat from mainland China to Taiwan after the end of Chinese Civil War in 1949.

Another effect of the Japanese colonisation on religious life in Taiwan was due to the modernisation of infrastructures. Before the 20th century the travel infrastructure of Taiwan was not very developed, and it was difficult for people to move from a part of the island to another. The Japanese quickly constructed a network of railroads connecting all regions of the island. In the field of religion, this promoted the rise in importance of some Buddhist, Taoist or folk temples as island-wide pilgrimage sites. During this time, some gods lost their local and sub-ethnic nature and became "pan-Taiwanese".

1945 onwards—Republic of China rule

In 1945, after the Second World War, the administration of Taiwan was handed over to the Republic of China through General Order No. 1. The People's Republic of China was established four years later in mainland China under the Chinese Communist Party.

In 1949, the 63th Celestial Master of Taoism Zhang Enpu (張恩溥) escaped from mainland China to Taiwan after the Government of the Republic of China retreated to Taiwan after losing the Chinese Civil War, bringing the religious leadership and orthodoxy of Zhengyi Dao to Taiwan. The lineage for the Celestial Master had since passed on to the 65th Celestial Master Zhang Yijiang (張意將).

The rapid economic growth of Taiwan since the 1970s and 1980s ("Taiwan Miracle") accompanied by a quick renewal of Chinese folk religion, challenging Max Weber's theories on secularisation and disenchantment, has led many scholars to investigate how folk religious culture, with its emphasis on values like loyalty, its social network of temples and gods' societies, may have contributed to the island's economic development. During the same period, folk religions developed ties with environmental causes. Chinese salvationist religions (such as earlier Xiantiandao) become increasingly popular in Taiwan after 1945, although some of them were illegal until the 1980s.

After the 1950s, and especially since the 1970s, there was a significant growth of Buddhism. Chinese Buddhism developed into distinctively new forms, with the foundation of organizations like the Tzu Chi, the Fo Guang Shan and the Dharma Drum Mountain, which follow the Humanistic Buddhism movement that was founded in mainland China during the early 20th century. Many highly realized Buddhist masters, such as Master Hsing Yun, Master Sheng-yen, Master Yin Shun, and others escaped from mainland China to Taiwan when the Government of the Republic of China retreated to Taiwan after losing the Chinese Civil War. They promoted Humanistic Buddhism reformist movement in Taiwan, which was pioneered by Master Taixu in mainland China. Tibetan Buddhism had also spread into the island. Since the 2000s, there has been an increasing cooperation between religious groups in Taiwan and mainland China which decreased tensions between them. Despite this, there are still tensions from past events, including Taiwan being removed from the United Nations by the People's Republic of China.

Religions

Major religions

Chinese folk religion

Chinese traditional, popular or folk religion, or simply Chinese religion, also called Shenism, defines the collection of grassroots ethnic religious and spiritual experiences, disciplines, beliefs and practices of the Han Chinese. Another name of this complex of religions is Chinese Universism, coined by Jan Jakob Maria de Groot, and referring to Chinese religion's intrinsic metaphysical perspective.

It consists in the worship of the shen (神 "gods", "spirits", "awarenesses", "consciousnesses", "archetypes"; literally "expressions", the energies that generate things and make them thrive) which can be nature deities, city deities or tutelary deities of other human agglomerations, national deities, cultural heroes and demigods, ancestors and progenitors, deities of the kinship. Holy narratives regarding some of these gods are part of Chinese mythology.

Chinese folk religion in Taiwan is framed by the ritual ministry exerted by the Zhengyi Taoist clergy (sanju daoshi), independent orders of fashi (non-Taoist ritual masters), and tongji media. The Chinese folk religion of Taiwan has characteristic features, such as Wang Ye worship. Even though Falun Gong is banned in China, people in Taiwan are free to practise it.

Chinese salvationism

As of 2005, more than 10% of the population of Taiwan adhered to a variety of folk religious organisations of salvation. The largest of them is Yiguandao (with 3.5% of the population), followed by Tiandiism (whose two churches, the Holy Church of the Heavenly Virtue and the Lord of Universe Church, counted together constitute 2.2% of the island's population), Miledadao (an offshoot of Yiguandao accounting for 1.1%), Zailiism (0.8%) and Xuanyuanism (0.7%), and other minor movements including Precosmic Salvationism and Daiyiism. The three largest ones—Yiguandao, Tiandiism and Miledadao—and some others derive from the Xiantiandao tradition, making this the religious tradition of more than 7% of Taiwan's population. Other salvationisms with an important presence in Taiwan, though not documented in the 2005 official statistics, are Confucian Shenism (also called Luanism) and the recent Weixinism.

Taoism and Confucianism
Taoism in Taiwan is almost entirely entwined with folk religion, as it is mostly of the Zhengyi school in which priests function as ritual ministers of local communities' cults. Taiwanese Taoism lacks a contemplative, ascetic and monastic tradition such as northern China's Quanzhen Taoism. The Celestial Masters, leaders of the Zhengyi school, have their seat on the island. Nowadays the office is split into at least three lines competing to head the Taoist community.

Politicians of all parties appear at Taoist temples during campaigns, using them for political gatherings. Despite this and the contention among sects for leadership, there is no unitary structure of authority overseeing all Taoists in Taiwan. According to the 2005 census, there were 7.6 million Taoists in Taiwan (33% of the population) in that year. As of 2015, there were 9,485 registered Taoist temples in Taiwan, constituting 78% of all registered temples.

Confucianism is present in Taiwan in the form of many associations and temples and shrines for the worship of Confucius and sages. In 2005, 0.7% of the population of Taiwan adhered to Xuanyuanism, which is a Confucian-based religion worshipping Huangdi as the symbol of God.

Buddhism

Buddhism was introduced into Taiwan in the mid-Qing dynasty (18th century) through the zhaijiao popular sects. Several forms of Buddhism thrived in Taiwan ever since. During the Japanese occupation, Japanese schools of Buddhism (such as Shingon Buddhism, Jōdo Shinshū, Nichiren Shū) gained influence over many Taiwanese Buddhist temples as part of the Japanese policy of cultural assimilation.

Although many Buddhist communities affiliated themselves with Japanese sects for protection, they largely retained Chinese Buddhist practices. For instance the Japanisation of Chinese Buddhism, the introduction of clerical marriage and the practice of eating meat and drinking wine, was not as successful as in the Buddhist tradition of Japanese-occupied Korea.

Following the end of World War II and the establishment of the Republic of China on the island, many monks from mainland China moved to Taiwan, including Yin Shun (印順) who is generally considered to be the key figure who brought Humanistic Buddhism to Taiwan. They gave significant contribution to the development of Chinese Buddhism on the island.

The Buddhist Association of the Republic of China remained the dominant Buddhist organisation until the end of restrictions of religious activities in the 1980s. Today there are several large Humanistic Buddhist and Buddhist modernist organisations in Taiwan, including the Dharma Drum Mountain (Fǎgǔshān ) founded by Sheng Yen, Buddha's Light International (Fóguāngshān ) founded by Hsing Yun, and the Tzu Chi Foundation (Cíjì jījīnhùi ) founded by Cheng Yen.

The zhaijiao Buddhist groups maintain an influence in society. In recent decades, also non-Chinese forms of Buddhism, such as Tibetan Buddhism and Soka Gakkai Nichiren Buddhism, have expanded in Taiwan. Adherence to Buddhism has grown significantly in Taiwan since the 1980s. From 800.000 in 1983 (4% of the population), the number of Buddhists expanded to 4.9 million in 1995 and subsequently to 8 million (35% of the population) in 2005.

Minor religions

Baháʼí Faith

The history of the Baháʼí Faith in Taiwan began after the religion entered areas of China and nearby Japan. The first Baháʼís arrived in Taiwan in 1949 and the first of these to have become a Baháʼí was Jerome Chu (Chu Yao-lung) in 1945 while visiting the United States. By May 1955 there were eighteen Baháʼís in six localities across Taiwan. The first Local Spiritual Assembly in Taiwan was established in Tainan in 1956. With a growing number of Local Spiritual Assemblies (Taipei, Tainan, Hualien and Pingtung), the Taiwanese National Spiritual Assembly was established in 1967. In the 2005 official statistics on religion issued by the Department of Civil Affairs, the Baháʼís had 16,000 members and 13 Local Spiritual Assemblies.

Christianity

Christianity in Taiwan constituted 3.9% of the population according to the census of 2005. Christians on the island included approximately 600,000 Protestants, 300,000 Catholics and a small number of Members from The Church of Jesus Christ of Latter-Day Saints.

Despite its minority status, many of the early Kuomintang political leaders of the Republic of China were Christians. Several Republic of China presidents have been Christians, including Sun Yat-sen who was a Congregationalist, Chiang Kai-shek and Chiang Ching-kuo who were Methodists, Lee Teng-hui is a member of the Presbyterian Church. The Presbyterian Church has strong ties with the Democratic Progressive Party since the 1980s.

Christianity in Taiwan has been on the decline since the 1970s, after a strong growth from 1950 to the 1960s.

Islam

Though Islam originated in the Arabian Peninsula, it had spread eastward to China as early as the 7th century CE. Muslim merchants married local Chinese women, creating a new Chinese ethnic group called the Hui people. Islam first reached Taiwan in the 17th century when Muslim families from the southern China's coastal province of Fujian accompanied Koxinga on his invasion to oust the Dutch from Taiwan. Islam did not spread and their descendants became assimilated into the local Taiwanese society adopting the local customs and religions.

During the Chinese Civil War, some 20,000 Muslims, mostly soldiers and civil servants, fled mainland China with the Kuomintang to Taiwan. Since the 1980s, thousands of Muslims from Myanmar and Thailand, who are descendants of nationalist soldiers who fled Yunnan as a result of the communist takeover, have migrated to Taiwan in search of a better life. In more recent years, there has been a rise in Indonesian workers to Taiwan. According to the census of 2005, there were 58,000 Muslims in Taiwan in that year.

In 2021 there were 280,000 Muslims living in Taiwan with most being foreign nationals. Taiwan is highly ranked as a Muslim friendly tourism destination.

Judaism

There has been a Jewish community in Taiwan since the 1950s. Since 2011, there has been a Chabad in Taipei.

Shinto

Gaoshi Shrine was the first Shinto shrine rebuilt after World War II.

Census statistics
The table shows official statistics on religion issued by the Department of Civil Affairs, Ministry of the Interior ("MOI"), in 2005. The Taiwanese government recognises 26 religions in Taiwan. The statistics are reported by the various religious organisations to the MOI:

The figures for The Church of Jesus Christ of Latter-day Saints were not from the MOI, rather they were based on self-reported data from LDS Newsroom. The figures for Jehovah's Witnesses were not from the MOI and they were based on the Witnesses own 2007 Service Year Report. In the original report both of them were counted as part of Protestantism.

See also
 Chinese folk religion
 Chinese ancestral worship & Ancestral temples
 Baishatun Mazu Pilgrimage
 Qing Shan King Sacrificial Ceremony
 Wang Ye worship
 Four Great Mountains (Taiwan)
 Temples of Taichung
 List of Shinto shrines in Taiwan
 Religion in China
 Religion in Hong Kong
 Religion in Macau
 List of temples in Taiwan

References

Citations

Sources

External links

台灣地區宗教簡介